was a Japanese Zen Buddhist monk and diplomat in the Muromachi period.  He was the chief envoy of a mission sent by the Ashikaga shogunate to the court of the Yongle Emperor in Nanjing.  He would return to China at the head of four subsequent missions to the Chinese Imperial court in Beijing.

Tenryū-ji abbot
In 1403, Keimitsu was the chief abbot of Tenryū-ji monastery.

During the 1430s, the temple entered into a tributary relationship with the Imperial Court of Ming Dynasty China.  Chinese imperial policy at the time forbade formal trade outside of the Sinocentric world order, and both the Japanese imperial court and Ashikaga shogunate refused to submit to Chinese suzerainty. This arrangement with the Tenryū-ji allowed for formal trade to be undertaken between the two countries, in exchange for China's control over the succession of chief abbot of the temple. This arrangement gave the Zen sect, and Tenryū-ji more specifically, a near monopoly on Japan's legitimate trade with China. In conjunction with the temple of the same name in Okinawa, as well as other Zen temples there, Tenryū-ji priests and monks played major roles in coordinating the China-Okinawa-Japan trade through to the 19th century.

Missions to China
The economic benefit of the Sinocentric tribute system was profitable trade. The tally trade (kangō bōeki or kanhe maoyi in Chinese) involved exchanges of Japanese products for Chinese goods.  The Chinese "tally" was a certificate issued by the Ming.  The first 100 such tallies were conveyed to Japan by Kenchū Keimitsu in 1404.  Only those with this formal proof of Imperial permission represented by the document were officially allowed to travel and trade within the boundaries of China; and only those diplomatic missions presenting authentic tallies were received as legitimate ambassadors.

See also
 Japanese missions to Ming China

Notes

References
 Fogel, Joshua A. (2009). Articulating the Sinosphere: Sino-Japanese Relations in Space and Time. Cambridge: Harvard University Press. ; 
 Goodrich, Luther Carrington and Zhaoying Fang. (1976).  Dictionary of Ming biography, 1368-1644 (明代名人傳), Vol. I;  Dictionary of Ming biography, 1368-1644 (明代名人傳), Vol. II.  New York: Columbia University Press. ; ;  OCLC 1622199
 Kerr, George H. (2000).  Okinawa, the History of an Island People. Tokyo: Tuttle Publishing.   (paper) ... with Mitsugu Sakihara.
  Titsingh, Isaac, ed. (1834). [Siyun-sai Rin-siyo/Hayashi Gahō, 1652], Nipon o daï itsi ran; ou,  Annales des empereurs du Japon.  Paris: Oriental Translation Fund of Great Britain and Ireland.  OCLC 300555357
 Verschuer, Charlotte von. (2006). Across the Perilous Sea : Japanese Trade with China and Korea from the Seventh to the Sixteenth Centuries (Commerce extérieur du Japon des origines au XVIe siècle) translated by Kristen Lee Hunter. Ithaca, New York: East Asia Program, Cornell University, 2006. ; 
 Yoda, Yoshiie. (1996). The Foundations of Japan's Modernization: a comparison with China's Path towards Modernization. Leiden: Brill. ;  OCLC 246732011

Japanese diplomats
15th-century clergy
15th-century diplomats
Zen Buddhist monks
People of Muromachi-period Japan